Beegum Creek is a stream located in Shasta and Tehama counties, in the U.S. state of California. The stream runs  before it empties into Cottonwood Creek.

The creek derives its name from nearby Beegum Peak.

References

Rivers of Northern California
Rivers of Shasta County, California